Hattalkhindi is a village in Parner taluka in Ahmednagar district of state of Maharashtra, India.

Religion
The majority of the population in the village is Hindu.

Economy
The majority of the population has farming as their primary occupation.

See also
 Parner taluka
 Villages in Parner taluka

References 

*हत्तलखिंडीची परंपरा आणि प्रसिद्ध स्थळे*

*हत्तलखिंडी* गावाला खूप जुना इतिहास आहे. तो इतिहास लोकांच्या पर्यंत पोहोचला पाहिजे ही आपल्या सर्वांची जबाबदारी आहे. परंपरागत चालत आलेल्या चाली, रूढी लोकांनी अजूनही जशाच्या तशाच जपून  ठेवल्या आहेत. इतिहासाची काही पाने उघडून पाहिली तर आपले गाव हे देव, देवी, श्रृषी, तपस्वी यांचा पदस्पर्शाने पावन झालेल आहे. त्याचा दाखला द्यायचा म्हटलं तर अशा पुरातन खूणा आजही अस्तित्वात आहेत. त्याच संदर्भात काही ठळक माहिती खालील प्रमाणे....

* प्रभू रामचंद्र वनवासाला जात असताना हत्तलखिंडी वरून गेलेल्या पाऊल खूणा आजही आहेत. उदा. रामाचा पावतका.

* सोनबाळीतील मंदिर खूप जुने आहे आणि ते एका रात्रीत झालेल आहे अशी ख्याती आहे.

* मुक्ताबाईच वास्तव्य आपल्या गावात आहे आणि जर पाऊस पडला नाही तर लोक पालखी घेऊन मुक्ताबाईला आणण्यासाठी ढुम्याला  (कुरणावर) जातात. पालखी गावाजवळ येते नाही तोच पाऊस सुरू होतो हा आजपर्यंतचा इतिहास आहे.

* गुढीपाडव्याच्या दिवशी लोक एकत्र येऊन गोटी उचलून पावसाचा अंदाज बांधतात. गोटी करंगळीने उचलली जाते तेही फक्त नऊ लोकांनी. प्रचंड श्रध्दा आणि विश्वास लोकांच्या मनात भरलेला असतो अशी ही प्रथा खूप दिवसापासून आजपर्यंत चालत आली आहे.

* महादेवाच मंदिर खूप प्रसिद्ध आहे कारण पिंडीच तोंड पूर्वकडे असलेली शिव मंदिर महाराष्ट्रात खूपच कमी आहेत आणि त्यामध्ये आपल्या महादेवाच्या मंदिराचा समावेश होतो.

* महादेवाच्या डोंगरावर पाच पांडवांच्या खोल्यांच दगडात कोरले कोरीव लेणी आहेत हे बहुतेक लोकांना माहिती नाही.परंतु अशा शक्ती स्थळांची श्रध्दा स्थळांची माहिती आपण सोशल मिडीया द्वारे पोहोचवली पाहिजे.

दशाबाईच्या पायथ्याशी आणि तीन डोंगराच्या मध्ये वसलेल ६००-७०० लोकवस्तीच छोटस गाव.अशा पवित्र गावाचे आपण नागरिक आहोत त्यामुळेच गावच नाव, इतिहास आणि परंपरा लोकांच्या पर्यंत पोहोचवायला मदत करा.

Villages in Parner taluka
Villages in Ahmednagar district